Deliver Us from Evil is a 2006 American documentary film that explores the life of Irish Catholic priest Oliver O'Grady, who admitted to having molested and raped approximately 25 children in Northern California from the late 1970s through the early 1990s. Written and directed by Amy J. Berg, it won the Best Documentary Award at the 2006 Los Angeles Film Festival and was nominated for the Academy Award for Best Documentary Feature, though it lost to An Inconvenient Truth. The title of the film refers to a line in the Lord's Prayer.

Synopsis
The film chronicles O'Grady's years as a priest in Northern California, where he committed his crimes. After being convicted of child molestation in 1993 and serving seven years in prison, he was deported to his native Ireland, where Berg interviewed him in 2005. Additionally, the film presents trial documents, videotaped depositions with O'Grady and other members of the Los Angeles Archdiocese (including Monsignor Cain and Roger Mahony), and interviews with survivors of O'Grady's abuse, activists, theologians, psychologists, and lawyers. Taken together, the material suggests that Church officials were aware of O'Grady's crimes many years before his conviction, but took steps to conceal them to protect him and the Church.

Reception
The film was well-received by critics. It earned a 100 percent "Fresh" critics rating from Rotten Tomatoes based on 72 reviews, with a weighted average of 8.36/10, and is currently ranked 31st among the site's highest rated documentaries of all time. The site's consensus reads: "Deliver Us from Evil is a superb documentary and a searing look at an institution protecting its leaders at the expense of its followers. A profoundly disturbing chronicle of a wolf in sheep's clothing, the film builds a clear-eyed case against pedophile priest Oliver O'Grady, and the Catholic bureaucracy that protected him. The recollections of O'Grady's victims are nothing short of shocking and heartbreaking." On Metacritic, the film has a score of 86 out of 100, based on 23 critics, indicating "universal acclaim".

The Irish Independent criticized Berg for having filmed children in Ireland without their knowledge or that of their families.

Aftermath
After the documentary was shown on Dutch national TV in April 2010, members of a parish in Schiedam recognized O'Grady as having been an active volunteer in the parish until January 2010. They had known nothing about his background. He had also been active in the Netherlands as an organizer of children's parties.

See also
 Catholic Church sexual abuse cases
Catholic Church sex abuse cases in the United States
 Roger Mahony's role in covering up sexual abuse in the Los Angeles Archdiocese
 Twist of Faith (2005), an HBO documentary film about abuse in the Catholic Church
 Mea Maxima Culpa: Silence in the House of God (2012), another HBO documentary
 Holy Water-Gate, a 2004 documentary
 Secrets of the Vatican, a 2014 documentary
 Sex Crimes and the Vatican, a 2006 BBC documentary
Spotlight, a 2015 film about The Boston Globe's 2001 investigation into cases of child sex abuse in the Boston area by Catholic priests
 List of films with a 100% rating on Rotten Tomatoes, a film review aggregator website

References

External links
  
 
 
 
 

2006 films
2006 documentary films
American documentary films
Documentary films about child abuse
Documentary films about Christianity in the United States
Documentary films about pedophilia
Films about child sexual abuse
Films about Catholic priests
Media coverage of Catholic Church sexual abuse scandals
Catholic Church sexual abuse scandals in the United States
Lionsgate films
Films directed by Amy J. Berg
2006 directorial debut films
2000s English-language films
2000s American films